Algeria competed at the 2014 Summer Youth Olympics, in Nanjing, China from 16 August to 28 August 2014.

Athletics

Algeria qualified 12 athletes.

Qualification Legend: Q=Final A (medal); qB=Final B (non-medal); qC=Final C (non-medal); qD=Final D (non-medal); qE=Final E (non-medal)

Boys
Track & road events

Field Events

Girls
Track & road events

Field events

Boxing

Algeria qualified one boxer based on its performance at the 2014 AIBA Youth World Championships

Boys

Cycling

Algeria qualified a boys' and girls' team based on its ranking issued by the UCI.

Team

Mixed relay

Fencing

Algeria qualified two athletes based on its performance at the 2014 Cadet World Championships.

Boys

Girls

Mixed team

Gymnastics

Artistic
Algeria qualified one athlete based on its performance at the 2014 African Artistic Gymnastics Championships.

Girls

Judo

Algeria qualified two athletes based on its performance at the 2013 Cadet World Judo Championships.

Individual

Team

Rowing

Algeria qualified two boats based on its performance at the African Qualification Regatta.

Qualification Legend: FA=Final A (medal); FB=Final B (non-medal); FC=Final C (non-medal); FD=Final D (non-medal); SA/B=Semifinals A/B; SC/D=Semifinals C/D; R=Repechage

Sailing

Algeria qualified one boat based on its performance at the Byte CII African Continental Qualifier. Later they were given a reallocation spot based on being a top ranked nation not yet qualified.

Swimming

Algeria qualified one swimmer.

Girls

Table tennis

Algeria qualified one athlete based on its performance at the African Qualification Event.

Singles

Team

Qualification Legend: Q=Main Bracket (medal); qB=Consolation Bracket (non-medal)

Weightlifting

Algeria qualified 1 quota in the boys' and girls' events based on the team ranking after the 2014 Weightlifting Junior & Youth African Championships.

Boys

Girls

Wrestling

Algeria qualified three athletes based its performance at the 2014 African Cadet Championships.

Boys' Greco-Roman

Girls' freestyle

References

2014 in Algerian sport
Nations at the 2014 Summer Youth Olympics
Algeria at the Youth Olympics